LZN or lzn may refer to:

 LZN, the IATA code for Nangan Airport, Matsu Islands, Taiwan
 lzn, the ISO 639-3 code for Leinong language, Burma